Sidnie White Crawford is professor emerita of Classics and Religious Studies at the University Of Nebraska-Lincoln. She specializes in the Dead Sea Scrolls and Textual Criticism of the Hebrew Bible. She also taught at St. Olaf College and Albright College. She has also been a visiting professor at Boston College.

White Crawford is the board chair of the W. F. Albright Institute of Archaeology in Jerusalem. She was awarded an honorary doctorate at the University of Uppsala in 2018.

Life

Education 
White Crawford has a MTS from Harvard Divinity School (1984) and PhD from Harvard University from Department of Near Eastern Languages and Civilizations (1988). The supervisor of her dissertation was Frank Moore Cross.

Published works 
Monographs 
 2008 Rewriting Scripture in Second Temple Times. Grand Rapids: Eerdmans. 
 2000 The Temple Scroll and Related Texts. Sheffield: Sheffield Academic Press. Also in electronic format: Logos Bible Software. 
Critical Editions 
 1995 "4QDeuteronomya, c, d, f, g, i, n, o, p" Discoveries in the Judaean Desert XIV, pp. 7–8, 15–38, 45–60, 71–74, 117–136. Oxford at the Clarendon Press. 
 1994 "4QReworked Pentateuch: 4Q364-367, with an appendix on 4Q365a" (with E. Tov), Discoveries in the Judaean Desert XIII, pp. 197–352. Oxford at the Clarendon Press.
Commentaries 
 2013 "Esther (Greek)," in The CEB Study Bible with Apocrypha (Joel B. Green, General Editor), Nashville: Abingdon, 61AP-76AP. 
 2012 "Esther," in The Women's Bible Commentary, Twentieth Anniversary Edition (revised and updated; eds. Carol A. Newsom, Sharon H. Ringe and Jacqueline E. Lapsley), Louisville: Westminster/John Knox, 201–207. 
 2010 "Judith," in New Interpreter's Bible One Volume Commentary (eds. David L. Petersen and Beverly R. Gaventa), Nashville: Abingdon, 547–554. 
 2006 "Esther," "Additions to Esther," in The HarperCollins Study Bible (rev. ed.; ed. Harold Attridge). San Francisco, CA: HarperCollins. 
 2003 "Esther," in Eerdmans Commentary on the Bible, Grand Rapids, MI: Eerdmans, 329–36. 
 "Esther," "Additions to Esther," "Judith," in New Interpreter's Study Bible. Nashville, TN: Abingdon. 
 2001 "Jonah" in The HarperCollins Bible Commentary. Ed. by James L. May et al. New York: HarperCollins, pp. 656–659. 
 1999 The Book of Esther. Introduction, Commentary, and Reflections. The New Interpreter's Bible; vol. III, pp. 853–941. Nashville, TN: Abingdon. The Additions to Esther: Introduction, Commentary and Reflections. The New Interpreter's Bible; vol. III, pp. 943–72. Nashville, TN: Abingdon. 
 1998 & 1992 "Esther" in The Woman's Bible Commentary. 1st and 2nd revised edition; eds. Carol Newsom & Sharon Ringe; Louisville, KY: John Knox/Westminster. 
Edited Volumes 
 2007 Up to the Gates of Ekron (1 Samuel 17:52): Essays on the Archaeology and History of the Eastern Mediterranean in Honor of Seymour Gitin. Jerusalem: Israel Exploration Society (with Amnon Ben-Tor, J.P. Dessel, William G. Dever, Amihai Mazar, and Joseph Aviram).
 2003 The Book of Esther in Modern Research. London: T & T Clark (with Leonard J. Greenspoon).

References

American theologians
American women academics
University of Nebraska–Lincoln faculty
St. Olaf College faculty
Albright College faculty
Harvard Divinity School alumni
Living people
Year of birth missing (living people)
21st-century American women